Inspiration, inspire, or inspired often refers to:
 Artistic inspiration, sudden creativity in artistic production
 Biblical inspiration, the doctrine in Judeo-Christian theology concerned with the divine origin of the Bible
 Creative inspiration, sudden creativity when a new invention is created
 Inhalation, the movement of air into the lungs, breathing in

Inspiration and the like may also refer to:

Places
 Inspiration, Arizona, a community in the United States of America

Brands and enterprises
 Inspire (fragrance), a fragrance by Christina Aguilera
 Inspiration (car), a British-designed and built steam-propelled car designed by Glynne Bowsher
 Carnival Inspiration, a Fantasy-class cruise ship operated by Carnival Cruise Line
 Honda Inspire, a luxury sedan introduced by Honda in 1990
 Inspiration, a type of diver's rebreather scuba made by AP Diving
 Inspire (company), a healthcare social network

Arts, entertainment, and media

Films
 Inspiration (1915 film), starring Audrey Munson
 Inspiration (1931 film), starring Greta Garbo
 Inspiration (1948 film), directed by Karel Zeman
 Inspirations (film), a 1997 film directed by Michael Apted

Genres
 Inspirational fiction, a fiction genre
 Inspirational music, a music genre

Music

Albums
 Inspiration (Aziza Mustafa Zadeh album), 2000
 Inspiration (Cathy Dennis album), 1993
 Inspiration (Eddie Henderson album), 1994
 Inspiration (Elkie Brooks album), 1989
 Inspiration (Jane McDonald album), 2000
 Inspiration (Maze album), 1979
 Inspiration (Shinhwa album), 2006
 Inspiration (Tammy Wynette album), 1969
 Inspiration (William Hung album), 2004
 Inspiration (Yngwie Malmsteen album), 1996
 The Inspiration, a 2006 album by Young Jeezy
 Inspire (Casiopea album), 2002
 Inspire (Jack Vidgen album), 2012
 Inspire (La'Mule album), 1998
 Inspired (album), a 2007 album by Lea Salonga
 Inspirations (Saxon album), 2021

Songs
 "Inspire" (song), a 2004 song by Ayumi Hamasaki
 "Inspired" (song), a 2017 song by Miley Cyrus

Periodicals
 Inspire (magazine), an online magazine published by the militant Islamist organization al-Qaeda
 Inspire, a quarterly newsletter published by Australian intellectual property firm, Phillips Ormonde Fitzpatrick

Other arts, entertainment, and media
 Inspiration (sculpture), a 2010 public artwork by American artist Ethan Kerber
 Inspiration FM, a community radio station in Northampton, United Kingdom
 The Inspiration Network, a worldwide family and religious cable-television network

Space exploration
 Inspiration4, a SpaceX tourism mission chartered by Jared Isaacman
 Space Shuttle Inspiration, a full-scale Space Shuttle mockup

Other
 Inspiration (racehorse), a Hong Kong-based thoroughbred racehorse
 INSPIRE, acronym for "Infrastructure for Spatial Information in the European Community" directive
Inspired, a loyalty program tier of SLH (Small Luxury Hotels Worldside), a partner of Hyatt's
 ANA Inspiration, the first major championship of the LPGA season in women's golf
 INSPIRE-HEP, a database of particle physics literature

See also
 Muse

de:Inspiration
ru:Вдохновение